Macedonia is a census-designated place and former town in Pickens County, Alabama, United States.  The population was 292 at the 2010 census, up from 291 in 2000. The town was incorporated in 1994, but disincorporated in 2001. It was reclassified as a census-designated place (CDP) for 2010.

Geography

Demographics

2020 census

As of the 2020 United States census, there were 241 people, 146 households, and 27 families residing in the CDP.

2010 census
As of the 2010 United States Census, there were 292 people living in the CDP. 91.1% were African American and 8.9% White.

2000 census
As of the census of 2000, there were 291 people, 114 households, and 69 families living in the town. The racial makeup of the town was 6.53% White, 91.75% Black or African American, 0.69% Native American, and 1.03% from two or more races.

There were 114 households, out of which 30.7% had children under the age of 18 living with them, 32.5% were married couples living together, 21.1% had a female householder with no husband present, and 38.6% were non-families. 37.7% of all households were made up of individuals, and 16.7% had someone living alone who was 65 years of age or older. The average household size was 2.55 and the average family size was 3.44.

In the town the population was spread out, with 29.9% under the age of 18, 9.3% from 18 to 24, 27.5% from 25 to 44, 19.2% from 45 to 64, and 14.1% who were 65 years of age or older. The median age was 33 years. For every 100 females, there were 92.7 males. For every 100 females age 18 and over, there were 98.1 males.

The median income for a household in the town was $23,958, and the median income for a family was $29,688. Males had a median income of $26,042 versus $16,875 for females. The per capita income for the town was $9,456. About 30.6% of families and 33.3% of the population were below the poverty line, including 40.2% of those under the age of 18 and 58.8% of those 65 or over.

References

Census-designated places in Pickens County, Alabama
Census-designated places in Alabama
Former municipalities in Alabama
Populated places disestablished in 2001